Un caso di coscienza (Italian for A matter of conscience) is a 1970 Italian comedy-drama film written and directed by Giovanni Grimaldi. It is based on the Leonardo Sciascia's short story with the same name, which is part of the collection Il mare colore del vino.

Plot
On the train home (fictitious town of Madda in Sicily) from one of his work trips in Rome, Advocate Salvatore Vaccagnino (Lando Buzzanca) comes across the women's magazine Lady Signora. On the page Ask Father Lucchesini there is a letter about the moral dilemma of a married woman who has committed an act of infidelity in spite of loving her husband. Caught between the pain of guilt and the risks of confessing to her husband, she asks for Father Lucchesini's help. Due to the gravity of the situation, Father Lucchesini recommends her to stay silent till the next issue until he puts more thought into the matter.

In order to put his peers in the city council club to shame, Vaccagnino reads them the letter concluding that all the married men in the council are potential cuckolds. A married man himself, Vaccagnino clears his name though by referring to a part in which the woman has given away that, from her house, she could often see her lover going to the bank, while the only thing that can be seen from Vaccagnino's is "the sea and nothing but the sea".

Trying to mend their injured reputation, others tail the postman to discover the subscribers, but to their disappointment, the only ones are the public places of tailor shop and the beauty salon. After getting their hands on a copy of Lady Signora the men sit together to read the article, some take an oath that if the woman turns out to be among their wives, they will do whatever it takes to regain their honor. 

However, the article begins with Father Lucchesini's apology for a typo that had happened in the previous issue because of which the word boat (barca) reads bank (banca), hence putting the  burden on Vaccagnino's shoulders. Even though the other members of the club stand up for him by claiming that parts of the sea can be seen from their houses too, Vaccagnino's pride is broken. 

Salvatore gets home to confront his wife Rita (Antonella Lualdi), and ends up offering her his mercy if she would confess. But no matter how hard he begs, Rita insists on her innocence. It makes Salvatore to offer her his confession in exchange for hers. Though Rita does not agree with the idea, Salvatore goes ahead anyway and confesses that he has a mistress in Rome who is pregnant by him.

But Rita tells him that it can not be his child as, contrary to what she had told her years ago when they visited a doctor, it is he who is infertile and not Rita. She confesses that she lied because she didn't want Salvatore's pride to be broken. She also tells him that she looks for nothing in return for her fidelity as it comes from nothing but the essence of her nature.

The next morning, when the club members are sitting with their wives in a café in the town square, Solfi (Raymond Pellegrin), one of the members of the council, whispers to his wife Sandra (Françoise Prévost) disapprovingly that writing to a magazine about her affair was not a good idea. Knowing about the affair the whole time and doing nothing enrages Sandra. The movie ends with her attacking Solfi and shouting in hysteria that she'd rather get perished by a man crazed by the jealousy of love than live with a man who pretends to love her.

Cast 

Lando Buzzanca as Salvatore Vaccagnino, a lawyer
Françoise Prévost as Sandra
Raymond Pellegrin as Solfi
Turi Ferro as a Judge
Saro Urzì as a pharmacist
Antonella Lualdi as Rita Vaccagnino
Nando Gazzolo as Alfredo Serpieri
Dagmar Lassander as Annalisa
Helga Liné as Lola
Paolo Carlini as Don Gualtiero  
Michele Abruzzo as Baron Carmelo Favara
Carletto Sposito as Benito Pozzi
Aldo Puglisi as Licasio, an accountant. After the passing of the late Buzzanca in December 2022, Puglisi became the only living actor in one of the roles of the city council members.
Franco Lantieri as Gaetano
Marcella Michelangeli as Gaetano's wife
Aldo Bufi Landi as Dr. Giulio
Gisèle Pascal as Giuseppina, Dr. Giulio's wife  
Alfredo Rizzo as the Club president 
Elio Zamuto as Nunzio

See also       
 List of Italian films of 1970

References

External links

1970 films
Italian comedy-drama films
1970 comedy-drama films
Films set in Sicily
Adultery in films
Films based on works by Leonardo Sciascia
Films directed by Giovanni Grimaldi
Films scored by Riz Ortolani
Films about lawyers
1970 comedy films
1970 drama films
1970s Italian films